Indian Creek is a stream in Lincoln County, in the U.S. state of Washington. It is a tributary of Hawk Creek. Indian Creek was named for the fact it flowed past an Indian village.

See also
List of rivers of Washington

References

Rivers of Lincoln County, Washington
Rivers of Washington (state)